25th & Commercial station is a station on the Orange Line of the San Diego Trolley located in the Grant Hill neighborhood of San Diego, California. The stop is dedicated to Hispanic civil rights leader Cesar Chavez.

History
25th & Commercial opened as part of the Euclid Line, the second original line of the San Diego Trolley system, on March 23, 1986.

This station was closed from May 16 until August 2012 as part of the Trolley Renewal Project, during which a temporary stop was erected just to the west, between 22nd and 24th Streets, to serve the area.

Station layout
There are two tracks running in the center of Commercial Street, each with a side platform. The westbound platform is to west of the 25th Street intersection while the eastbound platform is to the east.

See also
 List of San Diego Trolley stations

References

Orange Line (San Diego Trolley)
San Diego Trolley stations in San Diego
Railway stations in the United States opened in 1986
1986 establishments in California